is a former Japanese football player.

References

External links

j-league

1988 births
Living people
Komazawa University alumni
Association football people from Fukui Prefecture
Japanese footballers
J1 League players
J2 League players
Kawasaki Frontale players
Tochigi SC players
Matsumoto Yamaga FC players
Association football forwards